B. Holly Smith (Bennett Holly Smith) is an American biological anthropologist. She is currently a research professor in the Center for Advanced Study of Human Paleobiology at The George Washington University. She is also a visiting research professor at the University of Michigan Museum of Anthropological Archaeology. The majority of her work is concentrated in evolutionary biology, paleoanthropology, life history, and dental anthropology.

Early life and education 
Smith comes from a line of dentists and educators, including her grandfather, B. Holly Smith, Sr., MD, DDS (1858-1920) and her uncle, B. Holly Smith, Jr. DDS (1885-1956). All were named after Smith’s great-grandfather, Bennett Holloway Smith (1824-1902), who served as a circuit rider for the ME Church in Virginia and Maryland during the Civil War.

In 1975, B. Holly Smith received her B.A. in anthropology from the University of Texas, Austin. A year later, she received her M.A. in anthropology from the University of Michigan, Ann Arbor. Smith was awarded a Ph.D. in anthropology from the University of Michigan, Ann Arbor in 1983 for her dissertation, Dental Attrition in Hunter-Gatherers and Agriculturalists.

Employment and teaching experience 
From 1978-1983, she worked as a research assistant and research investigator in the Center for Human Growth and Development at the University of Michigan, Ann Arbor. After receiving her Ph.D., Smith was a visiting assistant professor in the Department of Anthropology at Arizona State University from 1984-1985. Since 1989, she has been an assistant research scientist at the University of Michigan Museum of Anthropology. Starting in March 2018, Smith started as a research professor in the Center for Advanced Study of Human Paleobiology at The George Washington University in Washington, D.C. In June 2019, Smith became a visiting research professor at the University of Michigan Museum of Anthropological Archaeology. Since 1986, she has been invited to lecture at several institutions and conferences, including State University of New York at Stony Brook, University College London, University of Washington, Duke University, University of Tennessee, Complutense University Madrid, Max Planck Institute of Evolutionary Anthropology, and International Society of Dental Morphology in Griefswald, Germany.

Professional service 
Smith holds memberships in the American Association of Physical Anthropologists, Dental Anthropology Association, and the International Association of Paleodontology. 
 Associate editor, American Journal of Physical Anthropology 1987-92
 Associate editor, Journal of Human Evolution 1990-93
 Advisory panel member, National Science Foundation Directorate for Biological, Behavioral and Social Sciences 1990-92
 Associate editor, Evolutionary Anthropology 1995-97
 Advisory panel member, National Science Foundation Directorate for Social, Behavioral and Economic Sciences: Six panels in 2014, 2015, and 2016
 Steering Committee member, Dental Anthropology Association, Spring, 2017
 Faculty Science Advisory Committee member, University of Michigan Museum of Natural History; three year term (2017-2019)
 Scientific panel member, 17th International Symposium on Dental Morphology, meeting in Bordeaux, France, October 4–7, 2017

Forensic work 
In March 1992, Smith provided the expert opinion for the Office of the Siskiyou County Public Defender in California. She evaluated the dental development of an accused immigrant to determine whether that individual was a juvenile or an adult at the time of the crime, which was a death penalty offense.

Field and museum work 
The majority of Smith's work has either been in expeditions to sites or research in museums in countries in Northern Europe and Eastern Africa. Smith's research mainly concentrated on dental morphology. Some of her most-cited publications include:

Research 
Smith is known for her research in the field of life history. She studies growth and development, from modern humans to early hominids to primates. Her research focuses on the evolution of life history. In her own words, life history includes “‘when to be born, when to be weaned, when to stop growing, when to reproduce, and when to die,’ and for toothed mammals we might include, ‘when to erupt teeth,’ because teeth process the foods that power all the choices." Smith has written over 50 published articles since 1979 in the field of anthropology.

Her early work focused on the significance of tooth wear in dating. In 1984, she published “Patterns of molar wear in hunter-gatherers and agriculturalists,” which contrasts the molar wear between hunter-gatherers and agriculturalists to learn more about the evolution of human diet.

Smith is also prominent in the field of tooth emergence. Her research into dental development made major contributions to the scientific understanding of the maturation of early hominids and the evolution of human life history. Her significant publications have focused on tooth emergence, weaning, wear, and their impact on life cycle. In 1991, she published “Dental Development and the Evolution of Life History in Hominidae,” in which she suggested that the life history of australopiths was similar to that of apes, whereas the life histories of later hominids were more similar to modern humans. Her article “Mortality and the magnitude of the ‘wild effect’ in chimpanzee tooth emergence” described how captivity affects the rate of tooth emergence in chimpanzees, and its larger implications for our understanding of primate life history.

In her 1995 article, “Toward A Life History of the Hominidae,” she cites the importance of the comparative method in her research. In the article, she suggests that the life history of australopiths was much closer to that of apes than modern humans, but at some point, the life cycle of hominids slowed to the rate and structure seen in Homo sapiens. Though a lot about this transition remains unknown, Smith emphasizes that new comparative methods of study will hopefully reveal further insights.

Her 1996 article, “Evolution of the human life cycle,” written with Barry Bogin, describes the five stages of human postnatal development. The article suggests that the human pattern is first seen in Homo erectus.

Her work has been influenced by her detailed research on three juvenile skeletons: the type specimen of Darwinius masillae, the Nariokotome Homo erectus skeleton, and the type specimen of Maiacetus inuus. All three skeletons were crucial to her conclusions about the evolution of life history in the hominin clade. Her work with the Nariokotome skeleton, in particular, culminated with the publication of “Growth and Development of the Nariokotome Youth, KNM-WT 15000” in 2009, which set out the evolution of the slow rate of maturation in the genus Homo.

She is currently researching the differences in life history between primates and other mammals, with a particular focus on birth, infancy, weaning, tooth eruption, and the transition to independent feeding.

References

American anthropologists
American women anthropologists
University of Michigan alumni
University of Michigan faculty
Year of birth missing (living people)
Living people
American women academics
21st-century American women